Irina Spîrlea was the defending champion but did not compete that year.

Lindsay Davenport won in the final 6–2, 6–3 against Mary Pierce.

Seeds
A champion seed is indicated in bold text while text in italics indicates the round in which that seed was eliminated. The top eight seeds received a bye to the second round.

  Jana Novotná (third round)
  Arantxa Sánchez Vicario (quarterfinals)
 n/a
  Conchita Martínez (quarterfinals)
  Anke Huber (third round)
  Lindsay Davenport (champion)
 n/a
  Iva Majoli (semifinals)
  Mary Joe Fernández (quarterfinals)
  Barbara Paulus (first round)
  Mary Pierce (final)
  Amanda Coetzer (semifinals)
  Brenda Schultz-McCarthy (third round)
  Elena Likhovtseva (second round)
 n/a
  Ruxandra Dragomir (third round)

Draw

Finals

Top half

Section 1

Section 2

Bottom half

Section 3

Section 4

External links
 ITF tournament edition details 

Amelia Island Championships
1997 WTA Tour